Demi-Gods and Semi-Devils is a Hong Kong television series adapted from Louis Cha's novel of the same title. It was first broadcast on TVB in Hong Kong in 1997.

Cast
 Note: Some of the characters' names are in Cantonese romanisation.
 Felix Wong as Kiu Fung / Siu Fung, & Siu Yuen-san (Siu Fung's father)
 Benny Chan as Duen Yu
 Louis Fan as Hui-juk
 Cheung Kwok-keung as Muk-yung Fuk
 Carman Lee as Wong Yu-yin, Lady Wong (Wong Yu-yin's mother), & Wong Yu-yin's grandmother
 Bondy Chiu as Muk Yuen-ching
 He Meitian as Chung Ling
 Rain Lau as Ah-tsi
 Jay Lau as Ah-chu
 Pat Poon as Duen Ching-sun
 Lisa Lui as Do Bak-fung
 Suet Lei as Hong Man / Mrs Ma
 Lau Dan as Ma Dai-yuan
 Lee Kwai-ying as Kam Bo-bo
 Michelle Fung as Chun Hung-min
 Ma Ching-yee as Yuen Sing-chuk
 Mak Cheung-ching as Yau Tan-chi
 Bruce Li as Duen Yin-hing
 Joseph Lee as Kau Mo-chit
 Chan On-ying as Tin-san Tung-lo
 Felix Lok as Muk-yung Bok
 Lily Li as Yip Yee-neung
 Ceci So as Lee Chau-sui
 Kong Hon as Duen Ching-ming
 Lau Kong as Yuen-chi
 Bao Fong as Sweeper Monk
 Henry Lee as Mo-nga-tsi
 Chiu Shek-man as Ting Chun-chow
 Kwok Tak-shun as Bak Sai-king
 Chan Wing-chun as Chuen Kun-ching
 Elton Loo as Bau Bat-tung
 Wong Wai as Ye-lut Hung-kei
 Natalie Wong as Princess Yinchuan (Meng Gu)
 Candy Chiu as Ah-pik
 Claire Chan as Plum Sword
 Ammathy Winnie Lui as Orchid Sword
 Ng Wai Shan as Chrysanthemum Sword
 Daisy Wong as Bamboo Sword

External links

1997 Hong Kong television series debuts
1997 Hong Kong television series endings
TVB dramas
Works based on Demi-Gods and Semi-Devils
Television series set in the Northern Song
Television series set in the Liao dynasty
Television series set in the Western Xia
Hong Kong wuxia television series
Television shows based on works by Jin Yong